Eugenia oblongifolia can refer to:

 Eugenia oblongifolia (O.Berg) Arechav., a synonym of Eugenia uniflora
 Eugenia oblongifolia Duthie, a synonym of Syzygium maingayi
 Eugenia oblongifolia (Sagot) Nied. ex T. Durand & B.D. Jacks., a synonym of Calycorectes grandifolius